Klára Fehér (21 May 1919 – 11 September 1996) was a Hungarian writer.

Life
Fehér was born in Újpest in 1919. She attended Budapest University from 1945 to 1948 while also being a newspaper journalist. In 1979 she became a freelance writer and wrote in a number of genres including work for children. She co-authored travel books with her husband László Nemes who was also a writer.

Fehér died in Budapest in 1996 and her husband founded a prize for literature in her name.

Works
 Narkózis: regény, 1969
 And don't miss Hungary!, 1976
 A tenger : regény, 1956
 Budapest, 1962
 Bezzeg az én időmben; regény, 1966
 Nem vagyunk ördögök, 1968
 Hová álljanak a belgák? : regény, 1988
 Oxygénia, 1974
 Ich bekomme eine Insel, 1975
 ''Négy nap a paradicsomban : regény, 1976

References

1919 births
1996 deaths
People from Újpest
20th-century Hungarian writers
Budapest University alumni
20th-century Hungarian women writers